Abdel Qissi (born 20 January 1960) is a Moroccan-Belgian actor and former boxer with eight recorded fights in the early 1980s.

Biography
Qissi was born in Oujda, Morocco and moved to Brussels, Belgium in his early years. In the 1980s he had a boxing career of eight fights consisting of five wins, two via knockout, one draw and two losses. Through his brother Michel, Qissi later became an associate of Jean-Claude van Damme to which he starred in some of Van Damme's movies.

He was a candidate in the commune of Ixelles for the 2006 Belgian local elections on the right-wing Mouvement Réformateur (MR) but was not elected, receiving 322 preferential votes.

Professional boxing record

Source:

Filmography

References

External links
 
 

1960 births
Living people
Belgian male film actors
Moroccan male film actors
Moroccan emigrants to Belgium
Belgian male karateka
Belgian Muay Thai practitioners
Shotokan practitioners
Sportspeople from Brussels
People from Oujda
20th-century Moroccan male actors
21st-century Moroccan male actors
20th-century Belgian male actors
21st-century Belgian male actors